Ramdevra railway station is a railway station in Jaisalmer district, Rajasthan. Its code is RDRA. It serves Ramdevra village. The station consists of a pair of platforms. Passenger, Express, and Superfast trains halt here.

Trains

The following trains halt at Ramdevra railway station in both directions:

 Malani Express
 Leelan Express
 Jaisalmer–Jodhpur Express
 Ranikhet Express
 Howrah–Jaisalmer Superfast Express
 Bandra Terminus–Jaisalmer Superfast Express
 Jaisalmer–Lalgarh Express
 Corbett Park Link Express

References

Railway stations in Jaisalmer district
Jodhpur railway division